Pocomoke High School (commonly Pocomoke, Pocomoke High, PHS) is a four-year public high school in Pocomoke City, Worcester County, Maryland, United States. With the grades of 912 the school is a part of Worcester County Public Schools. It is one of four public high schools in Worcester County along with Stephen Decatur High School, Worcester Technical High School, and Snow Hill High School. Pocomoke is a Maryland State Blue Ribbon School.

Overview
The school is located on the Eastern Shore of Maryland in the town of Pocomoke City in Worcester County. The school is on Old Virginia Road, which is west of the intersections of US 13 Business, US 13, US 113, and Maryland Route 366.

In 2016, former Principal, Dr. Annette Wallace was named the 2015-2016 Maryland State Principal of the Year by the National Association of Secondary School Principals and for providing exceptional leadership while building and sustaining a school climate of academic excellence where student achievement abounds.

In January 2023, Principal, Jennifer Rayne was awarded the Human and Civil Rights Award at the Maryland State Education Association's Martin Luther King, Jr. Celebration and Racial Social Justice Summit in Baltimore, MD for her efforts with Speak Up, a club dedicated to elevating student voice. The club explores the rich, diverse history and culture of all marginalized populations including women, immigrants, refugees, people of color, and members of the LGBTQIA community.

Students
Pocomoke's graduation rate has been somewhat sporadic from 1996 to 2008. In 2007 the school graduated 94.5%, up from 74.8% in 1998.

Sports
Pocomoke High School has a very competitive sports history, and a deep root in winning championships, sometimes referred to as "Tradition" in the small hometown. PHS has amassed 34 State Championships since 1971, most of which came from the Girls' Field Hockey Team (20).
Two sports have been crowned State Champions in 1995, 2001, 2003, 2005, 2006, and 2007.
In three school years, three State Championship teams were crowned: 2001-2002 Girls' Field Hockey, Boys' Soccer, and Boys' Basketball. 2007-2008 Girls' Field Hockey, Boys' Soccer, and Girls' Basketball. 2008-2009: Girls' Field Hockey, Boys' Soccer, and Girls' Softball, respectively.
Totals Per Sport:

State Champions:

State Finalist 

State Semi-Finalist

See also
 List of high schools in Maryland
 Worcester County Public Schools

References and notes

External links
Pocomoke High School website
Map of School from Google Maps

Public high schools in Maryland
Educational institutions established in 1957
Schools in Worcester County, Maryland
1957 establishments in Maryland